Samir Boughanem (born 8 August 1975 in Cluses, France) is a Moroccan retired football player. He last played for FC Meyrin.

Career
Born in France, Boughanem spent most of his career playing as a midfielder for clubs in Switzerland.
With Neuchâtel Xamax, he played in the 1999 UEFA Intertoto Cup against Shelbourne F.C.

He signed with the Shamrock Rovers in August 2003 under Liam Buckley and made his debut in the derby against Bohemians on September 1. Samir made 14 appearances for the team.

After he retired from playing, Boughanem received his UEFA A license and began a career as a football manager. He was appointed the manager of Swiss 1. Liga side Lancy FC in April 2022.

References

External links

1975 births
Living people
Moroccan footballers
Moroccan expatriate footballers
Morocco international footballers
French sportspeople of Moroccan descent
Neuchâtel Xamax FCS players
Racing de Ferrol footballers
Shamrock Rovers F.C. players
League of Ireland players
Expatriate association footballers in the Republic of Ireland
A.O. Kerkyra players
Expatriate footballers in Greece
Servette FC players
Swiss Super League players
Association football midfielders
Expatriate footballers in Spain
Expatriate footballers in Switzerland
Moroccan expatriate sportspeople in Ireland
Moroccan expatriate sportspeople in Spain
Moroccan expatriate sportspeople in Switzerland
Moroccan expatriate sportspeople in Greece
Étoile Carouge FC players